The 1998 Southern Conference men's basketball tournament took place from February 26–March 1, 1998, at the Greensboro Coliseum in Greensboro, North Carolina. The Davidson Wildcats, led by head coach Bob McKillop, won their sixth Southern Conference title and received the automatic berth to the 1998 NCAA tournament.

Format
The top ten finishers of the conference's eleven members were eligible for the tournament. Teams were seeded based on conference winning percentage. The tournament used a preset bracket consisting of four rounds, the first of which featured two games, with the winners moving on to the quarterfinal round. The top three finishers in each division received first round byes.

Bracket

* Overtime game

See also
List of Southern Conference men's basketball champions

References

Tournament
Southern Conference men's basketball tournament
Southern Conference men's basketball tournament
Southern Conference men's basketball tournament
Southern Conference men's basketball tournament
Basketball competitions in Greensboro, North Carolina
College sports tournaments in North Carolina
College basketball in North Carolina